Târgu Cărbunești Solar Park is a large thin-film photovoltaic (PV) power system, built on a  plot of land located in Târgu Cărbunești in Romania. The solar park has around 80,000 state-of-the-art thin film PV panels for a total nameplate capacity of 20-megawatts, and was finished in July 2013. The solar park is expected to supply around 28 GWh of electricity per year enough to power some 31,000 average homes.

The installation is located in the Gorj County in southern Romania in Târgu Cărbunești. The investment cost for the Slobozia solar park amounts to some Euro 35 million.

See also

Energy policy of the European Union
Photovoltaics
Renewable energy commercialization
Renewable energy in the European Union
Solar power in Romania

References

Photovoltaic power stations in Romania